The 2016 FIVB Volleyball World Grand Prix was the 24th edition of the annual women's international volleyball tournament played by 28 teams from 3 June to 10 July 2016. The Group 1 final round was held in Bangkok, Thailand. Brazil captured their record eleventh title in the tournament after a 3–2 win over defending champions United States. In the bronze medal match, The Netherlands prevailed in five sets over Russia. Natália Pereira was elected the most valuable player.

In the Group 2 finals held in Varna, Bulgaria, Dominican Republic defeated Poland in five sets and earned a promotion to Group 1 for the 2017 season.

Moreover, in the Group 3 finals in Almaty, Kazakhstan, Croatia defeated the home team in straight sets to earn a promotion to Group 2 in the 2017 edition.

Qualification
All 28 teams of the 2015 edition directly qualified.

|

|

|}

Format

Intercontinental round
Group 1, the 12 teams were drawn in 9 pools of 4 teams. In each pool, all teams will compete in round robin format. The results of all 9 pools will combine in 1 ranking table. The hosts and the top five ranked teams will play in the final round. The last ranked team after the Intercontinental Round could be relegated if the winners of the Group 2 Final Round can meet the promotion requirements set by the FIVB.
Group 2, the 8 teams were drawn in 4 pools of 4 teams. In each pool, all teams will compete in round robin format. The results of all 4 pools will combine in 1 ranking table. The hosts and the top three ranked teams will play in the final round. The last ranked team after the Intercontinental Round could be relegated if the winners of the Group 3 Final Round can meet the promotion requirements set by the FIVB.
Group 3, the 8 teams were drawn in 4 pools of 4 teams. In each pool, all teams will compete in round robin format. The results of all 4 pools will combine in 1 ranking table. The hosts and the top three ranked teams will play in the final round.

Final round
Group 1, the 6 teams in the final round will be divided in 2 pools determined by the serpentine system. The host team will be at the top position and the other teams will be allocated by their rankings in the preliminary round. The top 2 teams from each pool will play in the semifinals. The winning teams will play in the final match for the gold medals.
Group 2 and Group 3, the host team will face the last ranked team among the qualified teams in the semifinals. The other 2 teams will play against each other in the other semifinal. The winning teams will play in the final match for the gold medals and a chance for promotion.

Pools composition
The pools composition was announced on 19 August 2015.

Competition schedule

Squads
There are 21 players in team rosters. Maximum of 12 regular players and maximum of 2 liberos can be selected to play in each week. The full rosters of 21 players of each team can be seen in the article below.

Pool standing procedure
 Number of matches won
 Match points
 Sets ratio
 Points ratio
 If the tie continues as per the point ratio between two teams, the priority will be given to the team which won the last match between them. When the tie in points ratio is between three or more teams, a new classification of these teams in the terms of points 1, 2 and 3 will be made taking into consideration only the matches in which they were opposed to each other.

Match won 3–0 or 3–1: 3 match points for the winner, 0 match points for the loser
Match won 3–2: 2 match points for the winner, 1 match point for the loser

Intercontinental round
All times are Greenwich Mean Time (UTC±00:00).

Group 1

Ranking

|}

Week 2

Pool A1
Venue:  Beilun Gymnasium, Ningbo, China

|}

Pool B1
Venue:  Carioca Arena 1, Rio de Janeiro, Brazil

|}

Pool C1
Venue:  DS Yantarny, Kaliningrad, Russia

|}

Week 3

Pool D1
Venue:  Macau Forum, Macau, China

|}

Pool E1
Venue:  Walter Pyramid, Long Beach, United States

|}

Pool F1
Venue:  PalaFlorio, Bari, Italy

|}

Week 4

Pool G1
Venue:  Başkent Volleyball Hall, Ankara, Turkey

|}

Pool H1
Venue:  Hong Kong Coliseum, Hong Kong, China

|}

Pool I1
Venue:  Shimadzu Arena, Kyoto, Japan

|}

Group 2

Ranking

|}

Week 1

Pool A2
Venue:  Club Deportivo Floresta, San Miguel de Tucumán, Argentina

|}

Pool B2
Venue:  Hala MOSiR, Zielona Góra, Poland

|}

Week 2

Pool C2
Venue:  Sport Hall Up Olomouc, Olomouc, Czech Republic

|}

Pool D2
Venue:  Hala Mistrzów, Włocławek, Poland

|}

Group 3

Ranking

|}

Week 1

Pool A3
Venue:  Salle OMS Belkhdar Tahar, Algiers, Algeria

|}

Pool B3
Venue:  Bendigo Stadium, Bendigo, Australia

|}

Week 2

Pool C3
Venue:  Coliseo Evangelista Mora, Cali, Colombia

|}

Pool D3
Venue:  Coliseo Cerrado de Chiclayo, Chiclayo, Peru

|}

Final round
All times are Greenwich Mean Time (UTC±00:00).

Group 3
Venue:  Baluan Sholak Sports Palace, Almaty, Kazakhstan

Final four (Week 3)

Semifinals

|}

3rd place match

|}

Final

|}

Group 2
Venue:  Palace of Culture and Sports, Varna, Bulgaria

Final four (Week 3)

Semifinals

|}

3rd place match

|}

Final

|}

Group 1
Venue:  Indoor Stadium Huamark, Bangkok, Thailand

Pool play (Week 6)

Pool J1

|}

|}

Pool K1

|}

|}

Final four (Week 6)

Semifinals

|}

5th place match

|}

3rd place match

|}

Final

|}

Final standing

Awards

 Most Valuable Player
  Natália Pereira
 Best Outside Hitters
  Sheilla Castro
  Kimberly Hill
 Best Setter
  Nootsara Tomkom

 Best Middle Blockers
  Rachael Adams
  Thaísa Menezes
 Best Libero
  Lin Li
 Best Opposite
  Lonneke Slöetjes

Statistics leaders
The statistics of each group follows the vis reports P2 and P3. The statistics include 6 volleyball skills; serve, reception, set, spike, block, and dig. The table below shows the top 5 ranked players in each skill by group plus top scorers as of 26 June 2016.

Best scorers
Best scorers determined by scored points from spike, block and serve.

Best spikers
Best spikers determined by successful spikes in percentage.

Best blockers
Best blockers determined by the average of stuff blocks per set.

Best servers
Best servers determined by the average of aces per set.

Best setters
Best setters determined by the average of running sets per set.

Best diggers
Best diggers determined by the average of successful digs per set.

Best receivers
Best receivers determined by efficient receptions in percentage.

See also
2016 FIVB Volleyball World League
2016 Women's European Volleyball League
Volleyball at the 2016 Summer Olympics – Women's tournament

Notes

References

External links
Fédération Internationale de Volleyball – official website
2016 FIVB Volleyball World Grand Prix – official website
Media Guide – Introduction and Tournament History at 2016 FIVB Volleyball World Grand Prix
Media Guide – Preview and Competition Information at 2016 FIVB Volleyball World Grand Prix
Media Guide – Team Information and Players statistics at 2016 FIVB Volleyball World Grand Prix
Media Guide – Referees at 2016 FIVB Volleyball World Grand Prix
Media Guide – Tournaments Records and History World Ranking at 2016 FIVB Volleyball World Grand Prix
Media Guide – Historical Information at 2016 FIVB Volleyball World Grand Prix
Media Guide – Media Information at 2016 FIVB Volleyball World Grand Prix

2016
FIVB World Grand Prix
2016 in Thai sport
Sport in Bangkok
International volleyball competitions hosted by Thailand